Bride and Gloom is a 1918 American short comedy film starring Harold Lloyd. It is presumed to be a lost film. Like many American films of the time, Bride and Gloom was subject to restrictions and cuts by city and state film censorship boards. For example, the Chicago Board of Censors required a cut of two scenes of Lloyd in berth with woman.

Cast
 Harold Lloyd as Groom
 Bebe Daniels as Bride
 Snub Pollard
 William Gillespie
 Helen Gilmore
 Lew Harvey
 James Parrott
 Charles Stevenson (credited as Charles E. Stevenson)

See also
 List of American films of 1918
 Harold Lloyd filmography

References

External links

1918 films
1918 comedy films
1918 short films
1918 lost films
American black-and-white films
American silent short films
Silent American comedy films
American comedy short films
Films directed by Alfred J. Goulding
Lost American films
Lost comedy films
Censored films
1910s American films